Decaspermum is a genus of the botanical family Myrtaceae, first described as a genus in 1776. It is native to China, Southeast Asia, Queensland, and various islands of the Pacific Ocean.

species

References

Myrtaceae genera
Myrtaceae